Etec Systems was an American producer of scanning electron microscopes, electron beam lithography tools, and laser beam lithography tools from 1970 until 2005.  It was located in Hayward, California, and Hillsboro, Oregon.

Company history

Etec Corporation of Hayward, California, was formed in 1970 as a producer of scanning electron microscopes (SEMs), but later became a producer of electron beam lithography tools, and SEM manufacture was discontinued.

Etec later merged with ATEQ of Beaverton, Oregon (Portland area), which manufactured laser beam lithography tools. The combined company was named "Etec Systems" and offered a portfolio of lithography relying on both electron and laser beams. These products targeted the photomasks and reticles used in integrated circuit manufacturing.  In 1999 the Beaverton, Oregon portion of the company was moved to Hillsboro, Oregon.

Etec was purchased by Applied Materials in 2000, and organized within the Applied Materials corporation as an autonomous business group. In 2000, Etec employed 600 workers in Hayward.

In 2002, Applied Materials announced it was reviewing a plan to shut down Etec. Etec Systems was absorbed into its parent company Applied Materials in October 2005.

Products

Scanning electron microscopes
Originally formed in 1970, Etec produced scanning electron microscopes of very high quality; many instruments are still working well 30 years later. Designed by Nelson Yew, the Autoscan has produced excellent images, outperforming modern instruments subject to digital noise and other problems.

As the MEBES became the major product, the company was bought by Perkin Elmer, and the SEM manufacture was discontinued.

Electron beam lithography tools

Some time after 2002 the product line that constituted the original Etec offering (MEBES – Manufacturing Electron Beam Exposure System) was discontinued.  Most MEBES III tools have been decommissioned in favour of Etec CORE and ALTA laser lithography tools, which have a faster throughput and use a more environmentally friendly IP3500 type resist which does not require a solvent-based development process.  However, there continue to be a number of MEBES III and IV in use throughout the world currently.

Laser beam lithography tools

With the purchase of Etec in 2005, the Etec line of laser-based lithography tools continues to be developed and produced by Applied Materials.  A Swedish firm Micronic AB and a German firm Heidelberg Instruments is a competitor in laser-based mask-making solutions. However, the demand for Applied Material's laser lithography tool has allowed it to be still be the most widely available and used tool in the photomask industry.

References

External links
A picture of a presently used Autoscan (on the left).

Defunct manufacturing companies based in Oregon
Economy of Hillsboro, Oregon
Technology companies established in 1970
Companies based in Hayward, California
Defunct manufacturing companies based in the San Francisco Bay Area
Technology companies based in the San Francisco Bay Area
1970 establishments in California
Technology companies disestablished in 2005
2000 mergers and acquisitions
2005 disestablishments in California